Nicolas Rimsky (born Nikolai Alexandrovich Kurmashov; 18 February 1886 – 5 September 1941) was a Russian-French film actor, director and writer. He was born in Moscow, Russia. In 1931, he directed and starred in Pas sur la bouche (Not on the Mouth), based on an operetta by André Barde.

In The Happy Death (L'heureuse mort, 1924, with a screenplay by Rimsky from the story by Countess Baillehache) he plays an unsuccessful and unpleasant playwright who suddenly becomes much more successful when he is believed drowned (and also plays his brother who turns up for the funeral). Linda Williams, who calls Rimsky a "great comedian", praises his performance as "a gem of comic timing". Leonard Maltin said the film's "cynical take on the nature of celebrity makes it seem quite modern".

He also starred in comedy Because I Love You (Parce Que Je T'Aime, 1929) as a professor who marries his secretary then loses her affections to his godson.

Selected filmography
 Father Sergius (1918)
 The Porter from Maxim's (1927)
 Immorality (1928)
 Cagliostro (1929)
 The Patriot (1938)

References

External links
 
 1924 article on Nicolas Rimsky

1886 births
1941 deaths
Russian male film actors
Russian male silent film actors
Russian screenwriters
Russian male writers
Emigrants from the Russian Empire to France
French male film actors
French male silent film actors
French male television actors
French film directors
French male screenwriters
20th-century French screenwriters
Male actors from Moscow
Male actors from Marseille
Writers from Moscow
20th-century French male actors
20th-century French male writers